Verily Life Sciences, also known as Verily (formerly Google Life Sciences), is Alphabet Inc.'s research organization devoted to the study of life sciences. The organization was formerly a division of Google X, until August 10, 2015, when Sergey Brin announced that the organization would become an independent subsidiary of Alphabet Inc. This restructuring process was completed on October 2, 2015. On December 7, 2015, Google Life Sciences was renamed Verily.

Researchers
As of July 2014, members of the research team include Andrew Conrad, founder of LabCorp's National Genetics Institute; Vik Bajaj, an expert in nuclear magnetic resonance; Marija Pavlovic, who studies the effect of radiation on DNA; Alberto Vitari, a cancer biologist; Brian Otis, who worked on Google X's glucose-sensing contact lens; and Mark DePristo, who worked on the Genome Analysis Toolkit (GATK) at the Broad Institute.

Acquisitions and funding
On 9 September 2014, the division acquired Lift Labs, the makers of Liftware.

Verily Life Sciences in January 2019 raised $1 billion in funding. Andy Conrad remained CEO.

At the end of 2019, Verily sold its stake in robot-assisted surgery joint venture Verb Surgical to development partner Johnson & Johnson.

In August 2020, Verily announced that it is entering into the insurance market with the launch of Coefficient Insurance Company. The new subsidiary will be backed by Swiss Re Group's commercial insurance unit.

In September 2022, Verily announced Conrad would step down as CEO in January 2023, to be replaced by Stephen Gillett. Gillett became CEO on January 3rd, 2023.

In January 2023, fifteen percent of Verily's workforce was laid off as part of a broader restructuring by parent company, Alphabet.

Projects
Develop comprehensive solutions that combine devices, software, medicine, and professional care to enable simple and intelligent disease management for people with diabetes, in partnership with Sanofi.
 A spoon for people with tremors.
 The Baseline Study, a project to collect genetic, molecular, and wearable device information from enough people to create a picture of what a healthy human should be.
A health-tracking wristband.
 A disease-detecting nanoparticle platform working with the wristband, a project called Tricorder.
Advancements in surgical robotics, in partnership with Johnson & Johnson.
Development and commercialization of bioelectronic medicines, in partnership with GlaxoSmithKline
Development of miniaturized continuous glucose monitors (CGM) in partnership with Dexcom
 Contact lenses that allow people with diabetes to continually check their glucose levels using a non-intrusive method. On November 16, 2018, Verily announced it discontinued this project.
 Smart shoes for health tracking and fall detection
 Skin research with L’Oréal

See also
 Google X
 Calico
 Galvani Bioelectronics

References

 
Alphabet Inc.
Alphabet Inc. subsidiaries
American medical research
Biotechnology companies of the United States
Life sciences industry
Science and technology in the San Francisco Bay Area
Transhumanist organizations
Companies based in South San Francisco, California
Biotechnology companies established in 2015
2015 establishments in California